The 2018 ARCA Racing Series presented by Menards was the 66th season of the ARCA Racing Series. The season began on February 10 with the Lucas Oil 200 driven by General Tire at Daytona International Speedway and ended on October 19 with the Kansas ARCA 150. Races were broadcast on FS1, FS2 and MAVTV. Sheldon Creed won the championship, ahead of his MDM Motorsports teammate Zane Smith.

Teams and drivers

Complete schedule

Limited schedule

Notes

Changes

Teams

Cunningham Motorsports, due to the failing health of owner Briggs Cunningham, was put up for sale after the conclusion of the 2017 season. On January 9, 2018, the sale of the team was announced to longtime crew chief Chad Bryant. Bryant formed Chad Bryant Racing but kept the same cars, numbers and personnel that had been with the team previously.
Mullins Racing cut ties with Basham Racing, whose owner points they had used in past years. Mullins formed a new alliance with Hixson Motorsports, and Mullins used Hixson's No. 3 in some events.
Patriot Motorsports Group formed an alliance with Basham Racing to use Basham's No. 34 in select races.
DGR-Crosley debuted with Noah Gragson at Daytona.
Kimmel Racing entered an alliance with Finney Racing for Finney to use Kimmel's No. 69.
Mason Mitchell Motorsports ceased operations on July 30.
Following the deaths of James Hylton and his son James Jr., the team's driver, Brad Smith, took over operations of the 48 team, which was rebranded as Brad Smith Motorsports.

Drivers

Zane Smith drove full-time for MDM Motorsports in 2018. Smith had competed for MDM and Venturini Motorsports in 2017.
Natalie Decker drove full-time for Venturini Motorsports in their No. 25 entry. She ran part-time in the No. 25 during the 2017 season.
Travis Braden ran full-time in RFMS Racing's No. 27 entry. He ran part-time in the No. 27 last year.
Sheldon Creed ran full-time in MDM Motorsports' No. 28 entry. He drove part-time for MDM in multiple cars last year.
Chase Purdy full-time in MDM Motorsports' No. 8 entry. He ran part-time for Mason Mitchell Motorsports in 2017.
Michael Self raced with Venturini Motorsports for half of the season. He drove part-time for MDM Motorsports and Mason Mitchell Motorsports in 2017.
Brandon Grosso took over Ken Schrader Racing's No. 52 car. The entry was previously driven in 2017 by champion Austin Theriault. Grosso began his schedule at Nashville after Will Rodgers piloted the car at Daytona; Grosso was not old enough to compete. Grosso eventually left the team, and the No. 52 team shut down as well.
Joe Graf Jr. made his first foray into ARCA, teaming with Chad Bryant Racing for all races except Daytona.
Four drivers made their debuts at Salem in the spring: Colby Howard with Mason Mitchell Motorsports, Josh Berry with Chad Bryant Racing, Jack Dossey III with his family team, and Matt Dooley with Fast Track Racing.

Schedule

 *Tape delayed

Changes

Charlotte Motor Speedway, Gateway Motorsports Park, and Berlin Raceway all return to the schedule. The series had last visited Gateway in 2007 and Charlotte in 2004. The only road course on the 2017 schedule, Road America, was taken out for 2018. The races at Winchester Speedway and Kentucky Speedway were also taken off the schedule. The races at Elko Speedway and Lucas Oil Raceway shifted significantly. Elko moved to the middle of July because the first Pocono date was moved to the weekend that Elko had in 2017, and Lucas Oil moved to September because the NASCAR Indianapolis weekend was moved to September.

Results and standings

Races

Drivers' championship
(key) Bold – Pole position awarded by time. Italics – Pole position set by final practice results or rainout. * – Most laps led.

See also
 2018 Monster Energy NASCAR Cup Series
 2018 NASCAR Xfinity Series
 2018 NASCAR Camping World Truck Series
 2018 NASCAR K&N Pro Series East
 2018 NASCAR K&N Pro Series West
 2018 NASCAR Whelen Modified Tour
 2018 NASCAR Pinty's Series
 2018 NASCAR PEAK Mexico Series
 2018 NASCAR Whelen Euro Series

References

External links 

 Official website

ARCA Menards Series seasons
ARCA Racing Series